The Turbay T-1 Tucán was an Argentine single-engined single-seat light touring monoplane designed by Alfredo Turbay and built by . It first flew in April 1943.

Design
The Tucán is a parasol-wing braced monoplane with a fixed cantilever type landing gear, tailwheel and powered by a  Continental A65 air-cooled piston engine. It had an enclosed cockpit just aft of the wing trailing-edge with a sliding canopy.

Specifications

See also

References

Bibliography

1940s Argentine civil utility aircraft
Sfreddo & Paolini aircraft
Parasol-wing aircraft
Single-engined tractor aircraft
Conventional landing gear
Aircraft first flown in 1943